They Knew What They Wanted is a 1940 film directed by Garson Kanin, written by Robert Ardrey, and starring Carole Lombard, Charles Laughton and William Gargan. It is based on the 1924 Pulitzer Prize winning play They Knew What They Wanted by Sidney Howard. For his performance Gargan was nominated for the Academy Award for Best Supporting Actor.

Plot
When visiting San Francisco, Tony Patucci, an aging illiterate winegrower from the Napa Valley, sees waitress Amy Peters and falls in love. Returning home, he persuades his foreman Joe, an incorrigible womanizer, to write her a letter in Tony's name. Tony's courtship by mail culminates with a proposal, and when she requests a picture of him, he sends one of Joe. Amy accepts and goes to Napa to be married. Although horrified to discover that her prospective husband is the portly Tony, she decides to go through with the marriage. However, while Tony is in bed after an accident, Amy and Joe have an affair. Two months later, as Tony plans the wedding, she discovers that she is pregnant. Upon learning this, Tony pummels Joe, who leaves the vineyards. but forgives Amy, and insists that they still be married. But she is unable to forgive herself, so she leaves with the priest who has come to marry them, while Tony looks on, hoping that she will return one day.

Main cast
 Carole Lombard as Amy Peters
 Charles Laughton as Tony Patucci 
 William Gargan as Joe	 
 Harry Carey as the Doctor
 Frank Fay as Father McKee 
 Joe Bernard as the R.F.D.
 Janet Fox as Mildred
 Lee Tung Foo as Ah Gee
 Karl Malden as Red (his debut role)
 Victor Kilian as the Photographer

Reception
The film recorded a loss of $291,000.
William Gargan was nominated for an  Academy Award for Best Supporting Actor.

Other versions of the play
This marked the only time the play was filmed under its original title. Two previous film versions had been made: a silent film called The Secret Hour (1928), with Jean Hersholt in the Laughton role, and  an early talkie entitled A Lady to Love (1930), with Edward G. Robinson in the role.

Years later, in 1956, Frank Loesser turned the play into a semi-operatic musical entitled The Most Happy Fella. This was not filmed, but was videotaped in 1980 and shown on PBS.

References

External links
 
 
 

1940 films
1940 romantic drama films
American black-and-white films
Remakes of American films
American films based on plays
American romantic drama films
1940s English-language films
Films about infidelity
Films directed by Garson Kanin
Films produced by Erich Pommer
Films scored by Alfred Newman
Films set in the San Francisco Bay Area
Films with screenplays by Robert Ardrey
RKO Pictures films
1940s American films